Amtoudi is a Berber village of 1,000 people in the Anti-Atlas region of Morocco. Amtoudi is 235 km southeast of the city of Agadir. It is in Guelmim Province in the Guelmim-Oued Noun region.

References 

Mountain villages in Morocco
Oases of Morocco
Populated places in Guelmim-Oued Noun
Populated places in Guelmim Province